Members of the New South Wales Legislative Council between 1958 and 1961 were indirectly elected by a joint sitting of the New South Wales Parliament, with 15 members elected every three years. The most recent election was on 26 November 1957, with the term of new members commencing on 23 April 1958. The President was William Dickson.

See also
Third Cahill ministry
Fourth Cahill ministry

References

Members of New South Wales parliaments by term
20th-century Australian politicians